Paryphthimoides is a genus of satyrid butterflies found in the Neotropical realm.

Species
Listed alphabetically:
Paryphthimoides argulus (Godart, [1824])
Paryphthimoides difficilis Forster, 1964
Paryphthimoides eous (Butler, 1867)
Paryphthimoides grimon (Godart, [1824])
Paryphthimoides melobosis (Capronnier, 1874)
Paryphthimoides numeria (C. & R. Felder, 1867)
Paryphthimoides numilia (C. & R. Felder, 1867)
Paryphthimoides phronius (Godart, [1824])
Paryphthimoides poltys (Prittwitz, 1865)
Paryphthimoides sylvina (C. & R. Felder, 1867)
Paryphthimoides undulata (Butler, 1867)
Paryphthimoides vestigiata (Butler, 1867)
Paryphthimoides zeredatha (Butler, 1869)

References

Euptychiina
Butterfly genera
Taxa named by Walter Forster (entomologist)